The 1982–83 season was Newport County's third consecutive season in the Third Division and their 55th season overall in the Football League. County achieved their highest post-war league finish, just four points behind third-placed Huddersfield Town in the Third Division. Huddersfield were promoted to the Second Division, along with champions Portsmouth and arch-rivals Cardiff City. County had actually gone top of the table on Easter Monday after a win over Cardiff in front of 16,052 fans at Somerton Park, but only one win and four defeats from the next five games set up the away game at Huddersfield as the promotion decider. That game too was lost, and with it the chance of a return to the Second Division for the first time since 1947.

Season review

Results summary 
Note: Three points for a win

Results by round

Fixtures and results

Third Division

FA Cup

Football League Cup

Football League Trophy

Welsh Cup

League table

External links
 Newport County 1982-1983 : Results
 Newport County football club match record: 1983
 WELSH CUP 1982/83

1982-83
English football clubs 1982–83 season
Welsh football clubs 1982–83 season